This is a list of minister from Nitish Kumar cabinets starting from 24 November 2005 to 26 November 2010. Nitish Kumar is the leader of Janata Dal (United) was sworn in the Chief Ministers of Bihar on 24 November 2005 with help of Bharatiya Janata Party. . Here is the list of the ministers of his ministry.

Council of Ministers 
Source

|}

See also 

 Government of Bihar
 Bihar Legislative Assembly
 Third Nitish Kumar ministry
 Fifth Nitish Kumar ministry
 Sixth Nitish Kumar ministry

References

Bharatiya Janata Party
Janata Dal (United)
2005 in Indian politics
Bihar ministries

Nitish Kumar
2005 establishments in Bihar
2010 disestablishments in India
Cabinets established in 2005
Cabinets disestablished in 2010
2